Conquest of Elysium II ("II" denotes the version 2.0, the first Windows compatible version) is the title of a computer game produced by the Illwinter Game Design. Conquest of Elysium is a fantasy turn-based strategy game. The game can be played with up to eight human players. Single player against computer is possible. The game can run on very old computers and has support for Linux, Windows, Mac OS X and Solaris.

Game goal
The goal of the game is the elimination of other players by either eliminating their commanders or capturing their citadels. In the start the player can choose whether he wants to create a random map or load a scenario. Random maps ask not only the size of the map and the amount of some terrain features but they also require the player the select the so-called society the map will be based on. The societies range from early human settlements to a crumbled central empire. The societies affect how many settlements there will be, what kind of non-player creatures threaten the players and what kind of general shape the map takes. For example, the "Monarchy" setting has independent castles surrounded by farms and minor settlements as a dominant feature.

Characters
Next choice is what character to play. There are nineteen different characters to play. The characters are split into Warlords, Magic users, Priests and Non-humans. The character is in practice the "nation" the player selects. Different characters have different strengths and require vastly different playstyles. Warlords have strong military units and occasionally some special features such as the ability to levy soldiers or construct watchtowers. Magic users gather some unique resource and their strength is in their summoned or constructed creatures. Priests differ greatly from each other but they have either need to capture civilized settlements, either for converts or blood sacrifices, in order to use their powers which are at best quite apocalyptic or they need to gather herbs or fungi and use them for summoning or spiritual attacks.

The game map, made out of separate terrain tiles, is littered with different terrain types and locations such as old battlefields, settlements of varying size, mines and locations which can be used as additional citadels. Some locations have other uses for different player characters. Seasons change and affect the amount of money you get and how some spells work. Winter greatly reduces tax income and herbs and fungi don't grow.

Game play
The game is heavily combat oriented as the control of your nation is basically limited to buying units or changing the tax. Units are recruited centrally and are deployed into special structures called "citadels" which range from castles to wooden watchtowers. Large cities also double as citadels. The units cannot be moved without a commander who can command troops. Troops range from spearmen to siege engines and mythological and imaginary creatures of varying strength.

Combat is handled in a separate combat mode: when two armies clash the game calculates combat results in the turn generation and the player gets to see the battles during the turn generation. The combat is completely automated and the player can only watch once the combat starts. The opposing armies line against each other. Some units have special abilities which come into play in combat. The combat's graphical presentation is simple: the only things displayed are the units on a black background and the possible walls protecting the defenders. Sound effects are few and simple as are spell effects.

The game's interface is partially usable by both mouse and partially keyboard only. While this ensues that the game runs in truly minimally equipped computers it also makes the interface somewhat awkward to use.

Despite being Illwinter's least known game they have continued to support it and latest patch was released in 2014. On August 15, 2011, Illwinter announced development of Conquest of Elysium III.

External links 
http://www.illwinter.com Homepage of Illwinter Game Design.

1997 video games
Fantasy video games
Illwinter Game Design games
Linux games
MacOS games
Turn-based strategy video games
Video games developed in Sweden
Windows games